Edward Smith Hall (28 March 1786 – 18 September 1860) was a political reformer, newspaper editor and banker in colonial New South Wales.

Hall was born in London, one of six sons of Smith Hall, bank manager, and his wife, Jane née Drewry. Hall grew up in Lincolnshire, had a good education and as a young man was interested in social and religious work, which probably brought him under the notice of William Wilberforce. Hall travelled in the Friends and arrived at Sydney on 10 October 1811 with a letter from Robert Peel, under-secretary of state, which asked that assistance in settling should be given Hall, and stated that he had been strongly recommended by Wilberforce and others. Hall was given a grant of land, but in October 1814 Macquarie mentioned that he had "commenced merchant at Sydney", and he was associated in this year with Simeon Lord and others in the promotion of the New Zealand Trading Company. Hall had additional grants of land made to him in 1815, 1817, 1821 and 1822, but it would seem that in the early years at least, Hall was making little profit from them.

In 1813 Hall founded the Benevolent Society of New South Wales, later to be renamed the Benevolent Society.

Hall was opening speaker at a meeting on 5 December 1816 for the establishment of a bank. In 1817 Hall was appointed cashier and secretary of the Bank of New South Wales.

In 1818 an application had been made in England that Hall should be permitted to practise as an attorney, which was not granted. It was probably as a result of this application that Hall was appointed coroner of the territory in February 1820, however he did not hold this position for long, and in 1821 went with 10 assigned servants to the land granted him near Lake Bathurst. In 1826 he was back in Sydney, and on 19 May 1826 published the first number of The Monitor, at first a weekly but afterwards published twice a week. It exercised a strong influence on public opinion in connection with the existing form of government. It stood for trial by jury and a popular legislature, and it condemned in unmeasured terms the oppression of convicts, public immorality on the part of officers, and even the conduct of the governor himself. Actions for libel were brought against Hall, and, having been tried by a jury of military men nominated by the crown, he was convicted, imprisoned and fined. He had to defend seven separate actions, the fines amounted to several hundred pounds, and his terms of imprisonment totalled over three years. However, on 6 November 1830, on the occasion of the accession of William IV, Governor Darling issued a free pardon to Hall. But some six months before, Hall had written to Sir George Murray a letter in which he made 14 specific charges against Darling, and he had succeeded in enlisting the aid of Joseph Hume, who took up his cause in the British House of Commons.

On 1 October 1831 Hall stated in The Monitor that Hume had informed him that Darling was to be recalled. The governor himself considered his recall was due to Hall's efforts, as he immediately wrote to Lord Goderich that anyone reading The Monitor would see that Hall's "triumph is complete". Goderich, writing to Governor Bourke on 24 March 1832, denied that Hall's representations had affected the question of the recall of Darling, but there can be little doubt that it had a strong influence on it. Hall continued to conduct his paper now called The Sydney Monitor until 1838, when he transferred to the Australian, which stopped appearing in 1848. He was subsequently connected with Henry Parkes's Empire and towards the end of his life was given a position in the colonial secretary's office, Sydney. which he held until his death on 18 September 1860. Hall had other interests besides those mentioned. He was one of the founders of the New South Wales Society for Promoting Christian Knowledge and Benevolence, which started in May 1813, and was its first secretary; he was also secretary and a leading member of the Australian Patriotic Association. Hall was married three times: firstly on 21 December 1810 in London to Charlotte (died 1826), daughter of Hugh Victor Hall of Portsea, secondly on 3 August 1831 in Sydney to Sarah Holmes (died 1838) and finally on 3 March 1842 in Sydney to Emily Tandy. There were two sons and six daughters by the first marriage, a son and a daughter by the second marriage and a son by the third marriage.

To Governor Darling, Hall was merely a dangerous agitator whose actions must be stopped for the good of the state. No doubt a case could be made for Darling's conduct, but on one occasion at least it was of a kind that cannot be defended. Hall applied to be allowed to rent land adjoining his own, and his application was refused, not on any legal ground, but because he was the editor of The Monitor. Hall fought throughout with great ability, possibly not always wisely, considering that he had a young family to care for.  As he said himself afterwards: "I was young, generous and disinterested, but imprudent. I am now a wiser man, but not a better one". In August 1891 Sir Henry Parkes, speaking of the early friends of freedom in Australia, said: 
The name I mentioned first Edward Smith Hall belonged to a man of singularly pure and heroic disposition . . . he met the greatest form of aggressive power we ever experienced in this country, and he paid the price of resistance to it by all that kind of punishmerit which follows a man who tries to preserve the public spirit and awaken a love of liberty in a community. In spite of Parkes's eulogy, Hall's name fell into obscurity, until the publication of an article on him in the Australian Encyclopaedia, which was followed by Mr Justice Ferguson's more complete account read before the Royal Australian Historical Society.

External links
To Bank or Not to Bank: Edward Smith Hall on Free Trade and the Commodification of Money in Early New South Wales
A Manifesto for New South Wales: Edward Smith Hall and the Sydney Monitor, 1826–1840 Book synopsis at Australian Scholarly Publishing
R. v. Hall, Supreme Court of New South Wales details of libel case at Macquarie law
The Benevolent Society which was founded by Edward Smith Hall
Edward Smith Hall Family History Everything about Edward Smith Hall, known as Monitor Hall, and his descendants, as compiled by Sue Talbot

References

M. J. B. Kenny, 'Hall, Edward Smith (1786–1860)', Australian Dictionary of Biography, Volume 1, MUP, 1966, pp 500–502. Retrieved on 15 January 2009

1786 births
1860 deaths
Australian bankers
Australian people of English descent
Australian newspaper editors
19th-century Australian journalists
19th-century Australian male writers
Bondi, New South Wales
19th-century Australian businesspeople
Australian male journalists